Lamab may refer to:
Lamab-e Barmeyun
Lamab-e Gol Espid